Nationality words link to articles with information on the nation's poetry or literature (for instance, Irish or France).

Events
 French poet Maurice Sceve announces that he has found the tomb of "Laura", the woman who is the subject of so many poems by Petrarch, at the church of Santa Croce in Avignon, further strengthening French interest in the Italian poet.

Works published
 Luigi Alamanni, Opere Toscane ("Tuscan Works"), Latin elegies, published either this year or in 1532, Italian writer published in Lyon, France, said to consist of satirical pieces written in blank verse
 Teofilo Folengo, L'Umanità del Figliuolo di Die, a life of Christ in rhymed octaves, Italy
 Clément Marot, Suite de l'Adolescence clementine, France
 Dwija Sridhara, Vidya-Sundara, Bengali narrative poem, commissioned by Prince Firuz of Bengal
 François Villon, modernized edition of his poetry, published by Clément Marot

Births
Death years link to the corresponding "[year] in poetry" article:
 January 2 – Johann Major (died 1600), German poet and theologian
 August 7 – Alonso de Ercilla (died 1594), Spanish soldier and poet
 Eknath (died 1599), Marathi language religious poet in the Hindu tradition of India
 Elazar ben Moshe Azikri (died 1600), Jewish kabbalist, poet and writer
 Andrea Rapicio (died 1573), Italian, Latin-language poet
 Approximate date – Sun Kehong (died 1611), Chinese landscape painter, calligrapher and poet

Deaths
Birth years link to the corresponding "[year] in poetry" article:
 July 6 – Ludovico Ariosto (born 1474), Italian poet who also wrote verses in Latin
 Giovanni Francesco Pico della Mirandola (born 1469), Italian philosopher and Latin-language poet

See also

 Poetry
 16th century in poetry
 16th century in literature
 French Renaissance literature
 Renaissance literature
 Spanish Renaissance literature

Notes

16th-century poetry
Poetry